Antonio Vannetti (1663-1733) was an Italian painter and architect, active in Tuscany, and specializing in perspective (quadratura) painting. He was born in Siena. He painted for the Palazzo Vivarelli in Siena, where he painted with his mentor Giuseppe Nicola Nasoni, as well as with Nasini's son, Niccolo. He painted in the Palazzo Strozzi Sacrati in Florence, contemporaneously with Sigismondo Betti and Anton Domenico Giarré.

References

17th-century Italian painters
Italian male painters
Painters from Siena
1663 births
1733 deaths